Several lifeboats of the RNLI have been named RNLB H F Bailey,

, a  lifeboat that served at Cromer during 1923 & 1924.
, a  lifeboat that served at Cromer from 1924 until 1935.
, a Watson-class lifeboat that served at Cromer from 1929 until 1937.
, a Watson-class lifeboat that served at Cromer from 1935 until 1945.